Record of a Spaceborn Few is a 2018 science fiction novel by Becky Chambers, published by Harper Voyager in the US and Hodder and Stoughton in the UK. It is a sequel to  The Long Way to a Small, Angry Planet and A Closed and Common Orbit.

Synopsis
The novel explores life in the Exodus fleet that was mentioned in passing in the preceding books, from the viewpoint of five characters: Tessa (sister of Ashby from The Long Way to a Small Angry Planet), a laborer and mother to two children; Kip, a restless teenager; Isabel, an elderly archivist; Sawyer, a recent immigrant; and Eyas, a "caretaker" who performs Exodan funerary practices.

Reception
Record of a Spaceborn Few was a finalist for the 2018 Kitschies and the 2019 Hugo Award for Best Novel.

References

Wayfarers series
2018 American novels
2018 science fiction novels
American science fiction novels
Novels about artificial intelligence
HarperCollins books
Hodder & Stoughton books